Hancock House may refer to:

in the United States (by state then city)
Charles T. Hancock House, Dubuque, Iowa, listed on the National Register of Historic Places listings in Dubuque County, Iowa
Hancock House (Bedford, Kentucky), listed on the National Register of Historic Places listings in Trimble County, Kentucky
John Hancock Warehouse, York, Maine, listed on the National Register of Historic Places in York County, Maine
Hancock's Resolution, Pasadena, Maryland, listed on the NRHP in Anne Arundel County, Maryland
Hancock Manor, a former house on Beacon Hill in Boston, Massachusetts, also known as Hancock House
Hancock-Clarke House, Lexington, Massachusetts, listed on the NRHP in Middlesex County, Massachusetts
Rev. John Hancock House, Cider Mill and Cemetery, Florham Park, New Jersey, listed on the National Register of Historic Places listings in Morris County, New Jersey
Hancock House (Lower Alloways Creek Township, New Jersey), listed on the National Register of Historic Places in Salem County, New Jersey
Hancock House (Ticonderoga, New York), listed on the National Register of Historic Places in Essex County, New York
John Hancock House, Austin, Texas, listed on the National Register of Historic Places listings in Travis County, Texas
Moore-Hancock Farmstead, Austin, Texas, listed on the National Register of Historic Places listings in Travis County, Texas
Mills-Hancock House, Centerville, Utah, listed on the National Register of Historic Places listings in Davis County, Utah
Hancock-Wirt-Caskie House, Richmond, Virginia, listed on the National Register of Historic Places listings in Richmond, Virginia 
Hancock House (Bluefield, West Virginia), listed on the National Register of Historic Places in Mercer County, West Virginia